The OMEGA New Frontiers Championship was a secondary title in the Organization of Modern Extreme Grappling Arts (OMEGA) independent professional wrestling promotion. The title lasted from 1997 to 1999.

Title history

See also
OMEGA Championship Wrestling

References

External links
 OMEGA New Frontiers Championship

OMEGA Championship Wrestling championships